Treaty of Soldin may refer to
 Treaty of Soldin (1309) between Brandenburg and the Teutonic Order
 Treaty of Soldin (1466) between Brandenburg and Pomerania